Víctor da Vila is an activist in the Workers' Party (Argentina).

He studied at the National University of Córdoba.

He was elected as a provincial senator in Mendoza Province in June 2015.

References

External links 
video of him speaking at a meeting of students (Spanish)

People from Mendoza Province
Workers' Party (Argentina) politicians
National University of Córdoba alumni
Living people
Year of birth missing (living people)